Brian Simon (26 March 1915 – 17 January 2002) was an English educationist and historian. A leading member of the Communist Party of Great Britain, his histories reflected a Marxian interpretation.

Background and early life
The younger son of Ernest Darwin Simon, 1st Baron Simon of Wythenshawe and Shena, Lady Simon, he was the brother of the second Baron Simon of Wythenshawe, Roger Simon, the solicitor and writer on Gramsci.

After Gresham's School, Holt, Norfolk, where he was a contemporary of Benjamin Britten and Donald Maclean, and two terms at Schule Schloss Salem, under the headship of Kurt Hahn, Simon went up to Trinity College, Cambridge in 1934, becoming a leader of the University Education Society. In 1935 he joined the Communist Party of Great Britain (as his brother Roger would do a year later) and the student Marxist Study Group.

In 1940 Simon wrote to Joan Peel, his future wife, that at Gresham's most of his creative instincts had been driven out of him or deep underground.

After Cambridge he went to the University College London's Institute of Education to train as a teacher.

Career
In 1938, he was appointed to the newly formed Labour Party education advisory committee and was elected secretary of the National Union of Students branch at the Institute of Education, going on to become President of the NUS in 1939. He travelled to international student conferences, one such visit being with Guy Burgess to Moscow in the summer of 1939.

During the Second World War, Simon served in the Dorsetshire Regiment and the Royal Corps of Signals and was attached to the Phantom regiment (General Headquarters Liaison) which took him to many places and led to a lifelong friendship with the actor David Niven.

After the war, Simon taught in a Manchester primary school, then at Varna Street Secondary Modern, and for three years at Salford Grammar School, where he produced a play which gave Albert Finney his first stage role. From 1950 to 1980 he taught at the University of Leicester as a lecturer, becoming reader (1964), and professor (1966), retiring as an emeritus professor in 1980.

Simon emerged as a major figure in the world of education, writing on the history and politics of education and advocating a national system of comprehensive schools.

Anne Corbett, in her obituary of Simon in The Guardian said that he came under increasing attack in the late 20th century:

The Guardian obituary also said that Simon's writing had reflected a Marxian interpretation of history.

Publications
A Student's View of the Universities (1943)
Intelligence Testing and the Comprehensive School (1953)
The Common Secondary School  (1955)
Studies in the History of Education, 1780–1870 (1960)
Halfway There: Report on the British Comprehensive School Reform (with Caroline Benn, 1970)
Intelligence, Psychology, and Education: a marxist critique (1971)Bending the Rules (1988)Education and the Social Order, 1940–1990 (1991)A Life in Education (1998)

Personal life
On 12 February 1941 Brian Simon married Joan Peel, assistant editor of the Times Educational Supplement, the daughter of Home Peel, a civil servant in the India Office and descendant of Sir Robert Peel.

They had two sons, Alan (born 1943) and Martin (born 1944).

Primary sources
 Simon, Brian. The two nations and the educational structure, 1780–1870 (1960) a scholarly history in 4 volumes
 Education and the Labour Movement, 1870–1920 (1965)
 The Politics of Educational Reform 1920–1940 (1974).
 Education and the Social Order 1940–1990 (1991).
 Simon, Brian. A Life in Education  (1998), autobiography
Simon's personal papers are held in the Archives at the Institute of Education, University of London.

Further reading
 Corbett, Anne. "Brian Simon Communist party educationalist who advocated the comprehensive system and wrote a classic history of British schools" The Guardian 22 January 2002
 Lowe, Roy. "Simon, Brian (1915–2002), educationist and historian" in Oxford Dictionary of National Biography Lowe, Roy.  "Brian Simon," History Workshop Journal, volume 56 (autumn 2003), pages 298–300
 McCulloch, Gary.  "A people’s history of education: Brian Simon, the British Communist Party and Studies in the History of Education, 1780–1870." History of education 39.4 (2010): 437–457.
 McCulloch, Gary, and Tom Woodin. "Learning and liberal education: the case of the Simon family, 1912–1939." Oxford Review of Education 36.2 (2010): 187–201.
 Rattansi, A., and D. Reeder, eds. Rethinking Radical Education: essays in honour of Brian Simon (1992)
Obituary in History of Education Society Bulletin'', volume 69 (2002), pages 1–2
Obituary in Times Educational Supplement 25 January 2002
Obituary in The Morning Star 29 January 2002

References

Alumni of Trinity College, Cambridge
Comprehensive education
English educational theorists
Schoolteachers from Greater Manchester
People educated at Gresham's School
Academics of the University of Leicester
British Army personnel of World War II
Communist Party of Great Britain members
Younger sons of barons
1915 births
2002 deaths
Alumni of Schule Schloss Salem
Dorset Regiment soldiers
Royal Corps of Signals soldiers